Samantha Johnson (born 6 August 1992) is an Australian rules footballer who plays for Melbourne in the AFL Women's (AFLW). She has previously played for St Kilda.

AFLW career
 In August 2020, she was delisted by St Kilda.

In June 2022, Johnson returned to the AFLW after being drafted by Melbourne. After playing three games, Johnson announced she was pregnant on September 24, and would sit out the rest of that season: she became the first ever AFLW player to play while pregnant.

References

External links

 

Living people
1992 births
St Kilda Football Club (AFLW) players
Australian rules footballers from Victoria (Australia)
Sportswomen from Victoria (Australia)